Chumba is a traditional form of music and dance performed by the Garifuna people in several Central American countries. Like punta (another type of Garifuna music), chumba songs are highly polyrhythmic, but have a slower tempo. 

The chumba dance is a solo dance performed by a woman, often exhibiting a large degree of individual style.

References

External links
 How to Play Chumba - with Warasa Garifuna Drum School on YouTube

Garifuna music
South American dances